IG, Ig, or ig may refer to:

Companies
 IG Farben, a former German industrial conglomerate
 IG Group, a UK financial services company
 IG Recordings, a record label formed by the Indigo Girls, an American folk/rock duo
 Production I.G, a Japanese anime company
 Impressions Games, a defunct United States gaming company
 Internet Group, stylized as "iG", a Brazilian internet service provider
 Invictus Games (company), a Hungarian video game developer
 Air Italy (2018–2020) S.p.A. (IATA: IG), an Italian airline

Games
 Imperial Guard (Warhammer 40,000), from the tabletop strategy game Warhammer 40,000
 Imperium Galactica, a 1997 PC CD-ROM game by Hungary-based Digital Reality
 Insomniac Games, an independent video game developer
 Investment Game, an international stock market simulation game
 Invictus Gaming, a Chinese professional E-sports team
 Invictus Games, Paralympic sporting event
 Invictus Games (company), Hungarian video game developer

Government
 Inspector General, a high-ranking official
 Inspector General of Police
 Inspector General of Prisons

Places
 Ig, Slovenia
 IG postcode area, a group of postcode districts around Ilford, England

Science and technology
 Immunoglobulin, also known as antibody, a protein used by the immune system to identify and neutralize foreign objects such as bacteria and viruses
 Imperial gallon (ig), an Imperial unit of volume defined as 
 Insulated glazing, double or triple glass window panes separated by an air or other gas-filled space to reduce heat transfer
 Integrated graphics, the term for a graphics processor that is integrated into the mainboard

Other uses 
 Ig Nobel Prize, a parody of the Nobel Prize (ignoble)
 Igbo language, the official language of Nigeria, by ISO 639-1 language code
 Information governance, the management of information at an organisation
 Inscriptiones Graecae (IG), a collection of ancient Greek sources
 The IG-series, a series of combat droids in the Star Wars universe
 Instagram, a social media application
 Investment-grade bond or debt
 Italian Greyhound, a breed of dog
 Injustice Guild, the villainous counterpart to the Justice Guild of America